Aetna is an American insurance provider.

Aetna may also refer to:

Places

Canada
Aetna, Alberta

United States
Aetna, Craighead County, Arkansas
Aetna, Sharp County, Arkansas
Aetna (Gary), Indiana
Aetna, Kansas
Aetna, Michigan
Aetna, Hickman County, Tennessee
Aetna, Marion County, Tennessee
Aetna Springs Resort, California
Aetna Township (disambiguation), the name of several places
Etna, Illinois, formerly Aetna
Etna, Lawrence County, Ohio, formerly Aetna Furnace
Whiteside, Tennessee, formerly Aetna

Other places
Mount Etna (Latin: Aetna), Sicily, Italy
Aetna (city), an ancient city of Sicily

Other uses
Aetna (nymph), a mythological Sicilian figure
"Aetna", a poem ascribed to Lucilius Junior
, the name of several ships of the Royal Navy

See also

Mount Aetna (disambiguation)
Etna (disambiguation)
Aitne (disambiguation)